The New York City Tax Appeals Tribunal is an administrative court of the New York City government that conducts trials and hears appeals regarding city-administered taxes (other than real estate taxes). It is a non-mayoral executive agency and is not part of the state Unified Court System.

History
The tribunal was created by vote in 1988. The legislature implanted the tribunal in further legislation in 1992.

See also
 New York City Office of Administrative Trials and Hearings
 New York City Tax Commission

References

External links
 
 Tax Appeals Tribunal in the Rules of the City of New York

Tax Appeals Tribunal
Administrative courts
Courts and tribunals with year of establishment missing
Taxation in New York (state)